Guanting is a town in eastern Qinghai province, People's Republic of China. It is located in the southeast of Minhe County and, together with Guanting, Zhongchuan, Xiakou, Gangou and Xin'er townships, is referred to as the Guanting Area.

It is the home to the most densely populated Tu Zu settlement in China, who refer to the area as "Sanchuan".

Toponymy

The official Chinese name for the area is Guanting. Local legends accounted that the name came from the famous general, Guan Yu, who stopped by in the area on his way to look for his sworn brother, Liu Bei, the founder of the Shu Han Kingdom (221-263) in the southwest, after having left Cao Cao of the Cao Wei Kingdom (220-265) in China proper. The Chinese name "Guan" in Guanting came from the last name of Guan Yu, whereas "Ting" came from the Chinese character for "stop" or "pavilion".

The informal reference by the local residents of the Tu Zu is "Sanchuan", which literally means “Three Plains” and applies to the Upper, Middle, and Lower plains according to the geographic features marked by two seasonable rivers that flow from the north to the south into the Yellow River and divides the area. The Upper Plain, or Shangchuan, refers to the Zhaomuchuan Village of Guanting Township. The Middle Plain, or Zhongchuan, encloses Zhongchuan Township, which is separated from the Upper Plain by the Zhaomuchuan River. The Lower Plain refers to the Xiakou Township on the exit of the Yellow River that flows out of Qinghai into Gansu.

History
The town is home to the archeological site of Lajia, located in Lajia Village, which belong to the Qijia Culture, as well as the Majiayao Culture and the Xindian Culture. The site's artefacts date back to approximately 2000 BCE, and contain pottery, stone tools, bone tools, jade, a moat, human houses, and human skeletons.

Up until recently, the area has very much existed as an independent kingdom, where everyone spoke their native Monguor language and which enabled the preservation of their culture, characterized by Nadun, elaborate wedding and funeral ceremonies, and rich religious lives.

Archaeological discoveries and historical research hypothesized that the area is the homeland of the legendary Emperor Yü the Great, who established the Xia Dynasty (2070 B.C.-1600 B.C.), the first ever recorded dynasty in the ancient Chinese history.

Administrative divisions 
Guanting is divided into 1 residential community and 13 administrative villages.

 Guantingzhen Community
 Guanzhong Village
 Guanghui Village
 Wushi Village
 Xianfeng Village
 Qianjin Village
 Heyan Village
 Zhaomuchuan Village
 Zhaizi Village
 Baojia Village
 Lajia Village
 Guanxi Village
 Guandong Village
 Bieluo Village

Demographics 
The area is the homeland of the most densely populated Tu Zu settlement, who are known as “Monguor” in the West and as “Tu Zu” in China. About three hundred of their villages are densely distributed on the north bank of the Yellow River, which have been administered into about one hundred executive political villages by the Chinese Government.

Language 
The village is home to a unique dialect of the Monguor language.

References

Township-level divisions of Qinghai
Haidong